Dmitri Aleksandrovich Smirnov (born 14 August 1969) is a former Russian football player.

Honours
Tavriya Simferopol
Ukrainian Premier League champion: 1992

Kapaz PFK
Azerbaijan Premier League champion: 1997–1998

References

External links
 
 

1969 births
Living people
Soviet footballers
FC Dynamo Moscow reserves players
Russian footballers
SC Tavriya Simferopol players
Russian expatriate footballers
Expatriate footballers in Ukraine
Ukrainian Premier League players
Russian expatriate sportspeople in Ukraine
FC Shinnik Yaroslavl players
Russian Premier League players
Kapaz PFK players
Expatriate footballers in Azerbaijan
FC Vityaz Podolsk players
Association football defenders
FC Saturn Ramenskoye players
FC Lokomotiv Moscow players